Ashleigh Barty defeated Aryna Sabalenka in the final, 3–6, 6–0, 6–3 to win the women's singles tennis title at the 2021 Stuttgart Open. It marked her 11th career Women's Tennis Association (WTA) singles title and her second on clay. She became the first reigning world No. 1 to win the title since Justine Henin in 2007.

Petra Kvitová was the defending champion from when the tournament was last held in 2019, but lost in the quarterfinals to Elina Svitolina.

Seeds
The top four seeds received a bye into the second round.

Draw

Finals

Top half

Bottom half

Qualifying

Seeds

Qualifiers

Lucky losers

Qualifying draw

First qualifier

Second qualifier

Third qualifier

Fourth qualifier

Fifth qualifier

Sixth qualifier

Sources
 Main draw
 Qualifying draw

References

2021 WTA Tour
2021 Singles